Guillaume Peiffer (born 2 May 1928) was a Luxembourgian footballer. He played in nine matches for the Luxembourg national football team from 1950 to 1955. He was also part of Luxembourg's team for their qualification matches for the 1954 FIFA World Cup.

References

External links
 

1928 births
Possibly living people
Luxembourgian footballers
Luxembourg international footballers
Place of birth missing (living people)
Association footballers not categorized by position